Michael Bell (born July 30, 1938) is an American actor who is most active in voice over roles. He has acted in video games and animated series, including Legacy of Kain, The Transformers, G.I. Joe: A Real American Hero, The Houndcats, Rugrats, The Smurfs, and Snorks and appeared on-screen in film and television, including the TV programs Dallas and Star Trek. Both Bell's wife, Victoria Carroll, and his daughter, Ashley Bell, are actresses.

Early life
Michael Bell was born on July 30, 1938, in Brooklyn, New York, to a Jewish family.

Career

Live-action roles
His live action film career has included roles in films such as Thunder Alley (1967), Blue (1968), The Proud Rider (1971) Brother John (1971), Rollercoaster (1977), Fast Company (1979), How to Beat the High Cost of Living (1980) and C.H.U.D. II: Bud the C.H.U.D. (1989). Bell also appeared in live-action exploitation shorts and PSAs - scare films made in California during the early 1960s, ranging in content from venereal disease (Damaged Goods) to psychedelic drug abuse (Trip To Where).

He made guest appearances in multiple episodes of the Star Trek series. He also appeared in the Star Trek: The Next Generation pilot episode, "Encounter at Farpoint", as Bandi administrator Groppler Zorn, and in the Star Trek: Deep Space Nine episodes "The Homecoming" as a Bajoran and in "The Maquis."

Bell appeared in multiple episodes of Dallas as Les Crowley during the 1980–81 season, in M*A*S*H in the episode "Souvenirs" as Willie Stratton and also guest starred in two episodes of Three's Company as Rama Mageesh and Michael, a sleazy dance instructor in the sixth-season episode "Some Of That Jazz" (1981). Bell played Bill Duncan, Sabrina (Kate Jackson)'s ex-husband on Charlie's Angels, as well as appearing as King Edward Spencer on Jackson's series Scarecrow and Mrs. King. In 1970, he appeared in an episode of The Silent Force.

1970s and 1980s voice work
Bell had an important part in animated entertainment in the 1970s and 1980s. His first voice role was that of Stutz, the leader of The Houndcats. In 1973, he was Mark on the Hanna-Barbera series Speed Buggy. He voiced Redbeard the Pirate's Ghost in The New Scooby-Doo Movies episode "The Ghostly Creep from the Deep" as the second Redbeard themed monster in Scooby-Doo. Bell also reprised Mark on the same cartoon in the episode "Weird Winds of Winona".

From 1977 to 1984, Michael Bell played two of his best-known roles, Zan and Gleek on various Super Friends incarnations. He also voiced The Riddler on Challenge of the Super Friends. He also provided the voice of Lex Luthor as a young man, in the episode "History of Doom". However, Stan Jones was the voice of the adult Luthor throughout the series. Bell later played Luthor in the 1988 Superman series.

He was also Doctor Ben Cooper in Jana of the Jungle and in 1979, he voiced the title character of The Plastic Man Comedy/Adventure Show and later made a guest appearance as Doctor Octopus in another superhero show, Spider-Man and His Amazing Friends.

Outside of animation, Bell performed on records and commercials, including the Young Man in A&M Records' Story of Halloween Horror album in 1977, and Parkay Margarine and Mug Root Beer ads. Bell provided the overdubbing of Peter Criss' dialogue in the band KISS's TV movie KISS Meets the Phantom of the Park. In 1980, he provided the voice of the title character in The B.B. Beegle Show, an unsold TV show pilot that featured puppets.

Throughout the 1980s, Michael Bell starred in four hit animated series; 
 as Grouchy Smurf, Lazy Smurf, Handy Smurf and Johan in The Smurfs 
 as Prowl, Scrapper, Sideswipe, Bombshell, First Aid, Swoop, Gort, Brainstorm and Doctor Fujiyama in The Transformers and The Transformers: The Movie
 as Duke, Xamot, Blowtorch and numerous others in G.I. Joe: A Real American Hero and G.I. Joe: The Movie
 as Lance & Sven in Voltron: Defender of the Universe.

He also starred in the 1982 animated series The Incredible Hulk. The Hulk was voiced by Bob Holt, while his human side, Bruce Banner, was played by Bell. In a 2004 interview, he joked about how Bob Holt would be annoyed that he was growling his throat out while Bell got the easier stuff.

During this time, the actor also played Hiro Taka on Spiral Zone and Allstar Seaworthy on The Snorks (1984-1989)

Later voice work
Bell continues to work in animation in the 1990s and into the 21st century in movies and television, with roles such as Quackerjack from Disney's Darkwing Duck, Aziz on Aladdin and Ezekiel Rage on The Real Adventures of Jonny Quest. He was also featured as Opus in the Bloom County television special A Wish for Wings That Work.

From 1991 to 2004, in the Rugrats and All Grown Up!, he voiced three of the main characters' parents; Drew Pickles, Charles Finster Sr., and Boris Kropotkin.

Bell did the voices of Drake on W.I.T.C.H., Max Hauser, Duke's Dad on G.I. Joe: Renegades, Willy Wachowski on Handy Manny and additional roles in Tangled (2010).

In 2018, Bell reprised his role as Quackerjack on the reboot of DuckTales.

Video game voice work
He is also a prolific voice in video games, which include Soldier of Fortune II: Double Helix, Warcraft III: Reign of Chaos, Diablo II: Lord of Destruction, Age of Empires III, Baldur's Gate, Ratchet & Clank, the character Dark Fact in the game Ys I & II, and the character Raziel in three games in the Legacy of Kain series, among many others. He also plays the Fear in Metal Gear Solid 3: Snake Eater.

Documentary narration
He narrated the  documentary programs Earth's Fury (also known as Anatomy of Disaster internationally), Expeditions to the Edge, Bullet Catchers and Mysteries of Asia, while he narrated some episodes of E! True Hollywood Story.

Stage roles
In 1983, he and his future wife Victoria Carroll opened The West End Playhouse in Van Nuys. The two of them organized, wrote, directed, and acted in dozens of productions.

One of the most notable was The Ladies of the Camillias in which Bell played the villain Ivan and Victoria starred as Madame Sarah Bernhardt. The play won multiple Drama Logue Awards.

He served as the theater's director until 1988, when by mutual agreement to devote more time to their child, Bell and Carroll sold the theater to Edmund Gaynes and Pamela Hall.

Voice director
Bell was the voice director for Kidd Video, Peter Pan and the Pirates, as well as the web series The LeBrons.

Union activism
On March 30, 2012, the Screen Actors Guild (SAG) and the American Federation of Television and Radio Artists (AFTRA) completed a merger of equals forming a new union SAG-AFTRA. As a result of this merger, a group of actors including Bell, fellow voice actors Wendy Schaal, Clancy Brown, Schaal's former stepmother Valerie Harper, and other actors including former SAG President Edward Asner, Martin Sheen, Ed Harris and Nancy Sinatra immediately sued against the current SAG President Ken Howard and several SAG Vice Presidents to overturn the merger and separate the (now merged) two unions because of their claims that the election was improper. The lawsuit was dropped by the plaintiffs several months later.

Inventor
In 1991, he and his colleague Melanie Chartoff conceived the Grayway Rotating Drain, a graywater recycling device for reuse of shower and sink water in the home. The following year, they finished and patented the product with the help of Ronald K. Ford.

Personal life
Bell has been married to actress Victoria Carroll since 1984. Together they have a daughter, Ashley Bell, who is also an actress. He is an animal rights activist. He is the godfather of actor Steve Guttenberg, who cites Bell as his inspiration to become an actor.

Bell served on the board of directors of the Los Angeles Local of SAG-AFTRA in 2016 until 2019.

Filmography

Film

Television

Animated film

Animation

Video games

Crew work

Voice director
 Kidd Video - Casting and voice director
 Peter Pan and the Pirates - Voice director
 The LeBrons

References

External links

 
 
 Michael Bell at http://www.voicechasers.com

1938 births
20th-century American male actors
21st-century American male actors
21st-century American Jews
American casting directors
American inventors
American male film actors
American male stage actors
American male television actors
American male video game actors
American male voice actors
American voice directors
Jewish American male actors
Living people
People from Brooklyn